Always Guaranteed is the 28th studio album by Cliff Richard, released in 1987. The album peaked at number 5 in the UK Albums Chart, and spent a total of 24 weeks on the chart over 1987–88. The album was certified Platinum by the BPI and achieved sales over 1.3 million globally. The album was produced by Alan Tarney who had produced two of Richard's previous albums, Wired for Sound and I'm No Hero in the early 1980s and written Richard's highest selling single "We Don't Talk Anymore" in 1979. Tarney wrote all but one track on the album.

Four songs from the album were released as singles - "My Pretty One" (UK No. 6), "Some People" (UK No. 3 and certified silver for 250,000 sales), "Remember Me" (UK No. 35) and "Two Hearts" (UK No. 34).

The album marked another strong chart comeback for Richard, giving him a second spell of success in the 1980s, which continued with "Mistletoe and Wine" as the single following on from "Two Hearts".

As was sometimes the case on albums written and produced by Alan Tarney, this album contains two songs that Tarney had previously provided to other artists. "Remember Me" had first been recorded by David Cassidy on his 1985 Romance album. However, Tarney further refined the song for Richard, including rewriting the verses' lyrics. "My Pretty One" had first been recorded by Jamie Rae in 1985 and released as a single but had not become a hit. Richard is quoted as saying he'd never have recorded the song if he'd known someone else had recorded it, but also said after finding out, he didn't mind and later, when discussing the varied styles of songs he'd sung, said about "My Pretty One", "It's just a great pop song".

In the US, the album was retitled simply as Cliff Richard. Richard's original 1965 self-titled album had not been released in the US, so there was no conflict.

Track listing

Personnel
Cliff Richard – vocals
Alan Tarney – guitar, bass, keyboards, backing vocals, programming, arrangements
Chris Eaton – additional backing vocals
Paul Cox – photography

Charts

Weekly charts

Year-end charts

Certifications

References

External links
 https://www.bbc.co.uk/music/release/nvf9/
 http://www.sir-cliff.com/rerelease3.html
 Always Guaranteed: Amazon.co.uk: Music

Cliff Richard albums
1987 albums
EMI Records albums
Albums produced by Alan Tarney